Federico Guglielmo Jehuda Pollack, known as Gino Parin (25 August 1876, in Trieste – 9 June 1944, in Bergen-Belsen) was an Italian painter of Jewish ancestry; known primarily for his portraits of women. He was also known as Friedrich Pollak or Polak.

Biography
He began his studies in his home town with Eugenio Scomparini (who may have inspired his pseudonym), then attended the Accademia di Belle Arti di Venezia. He finished his studies at the Academy of Fine Arts, Munich with Karl Raupp.  It was there he had his first exhibition. At first, he was mostly a caricaturist; satirizing the conventional German bourgeoisie. 

While visiting Paris, he met Ella Auler (1875–1962), an artist and musician from St.Louis, Missouri. Later, they were married. Their son, Edgar, emigrated to the United States and, together with his wife, Ingri, became a noted writer and illustrator of children's books.

In 1913, he won a gold medal at the XI Internationalen Kunstausstellung in the Glaspalast.

Between the wars, he exhibited in Vienna (where he was a member of the Hagenbund) and Trieste, and had two showings at the  Biennale di Venezia. He also attended exhibitions overseas and was awarded another gold medal at the Internazionale Quadriennale of Turin in 1923.

He maintained close ties with Germany, although the racial laws prohibited him from exhibiting there after 1938. When he was a young man, he had acquired Swiss citizenship and was a legal resident of Campo Blenio. Nevertheless, he was detained in Italy and deported to the concentration camp at Bergen-Belsen. Along the way, he became seriously ill and died shortly after arriving.

References

Further reading
 Claudia Ragazzoni, Gino Parin, Fondazione CRTrieste, 2003.
 Fabio Lamacchia, Gino Parin, Il suo album ricordi. Galleria editrice Artè, Trieste, 1994.

External links 

More works by Parin @ Blouin Art Sales Index.
 Gino Parin @ Our Family History and Ancestry: Bernethy-Eby-Scribner-Hord

1876 births
1944 deaths
20th-century Italian painters
Italian portrait painters
Jewish painters
Italian people who died in Bergen-Belsen concentration camp
Artists from Trieste
Italian Jews who died in the Holocaust
Italian people of Jewish descent